Blaine is a surname. Notable people with the surname include:

Barbara Blaine (1956-2017), founder and president of Survivors Network of those Abused by Priests (SNAP), a U.S. advocacy group for survivors
Dan Blaine (1891–1958), American football player and National Football League team owner
David Blaine (born 1973), American illusionist and stunt performer
Ed Blaine (born 1940), American National Football League player and pharmaceutical researcher
Ephraim Blaine (1741–1804), early Pennsylvania settler and commissary-general in the Continental Army
Greg Blaine (born 1961), American politician, farmer, and businessman
Hal Blaine (1929-2019), pop music drummer
James G. Blaine (1830–1893), American politician, Speaker of the United States House of Representatives
Jason Blaine (born 1980), Canadian country music singer and songwriter
Jerry Blaine (1910-1973), American bandleader, label owner, record distributor and singer
John J. Blaine (1875–1934), United States Senator and Governor of Wisconsin
Marcie Blaine (born 1944), American singer
Nell Blaine (1922-1996), American landscape painter and watercolorist
Robert Stickney Blaine (1816-1897), English politician
Suessa Baldridge Blaine (1860-1932), American writer of temperance pageants
Vivian Blaine (1921–1995), American actress and singer

Fictional characters include:
Richard "Rick" Blaine, protagonist of the 1942 film Casablanca, played by Humphrey Bogart

See also
Blaine (given name)
Blain (surname)
Blane, surname